Frank Ivory was the first Indigenous Australian to play representative rugby union (for Queensland). This occurred in 1893.

The Frank Ivory Medal is named after him.

References
 Tatz, C. & Tatz, P. (1996) Black Diamonds, Allen & Unwin: Sydney. .
 Tatz, C. & Tatz, P. (2000) Black Gold, Aboriginal Studies Press: Canberra. .

Indigenous Australian rugby union players
Queensland Reds players